Thoros of Marash, also known as Thatoul (late 11th – early 12th century) was the Armenian lord of Marash and likely the father of Arda of Armenia (died after 1116), the first queen consort of the Kingdom of Jerusalem.

Biography

Thoros was one of the Armenian chieftains who came to control parts of the short-lived principality of Philaretos Brachamios after Philaretos' death. Thoros had likely been a former lieutenant of Philaretos and became lord of the region around Marash, apparently recognised also by the Byzantines. Thoros was Greek Orthodox, contrary to the majority of his countrymen who were Armenian Orthodox, and, having been a former Byzantine official, more alligned the Byzantine Empire than neighbouring Armenian principalities such as the ones of Constantine I, son of Roupen or Kogh Vasil. In 1097 he hosted the main army of the First Crusade while it was passing through Marash on its way to Antioch for around a week and was confirmed in his authority as Byzantine vassal.

After having successfully resisted the attacks of Bohemond of Taranto, a former member of the First Crusade who had founded his own principality at Antioch in 1099, Thoros was finally foced to cede Marash to Joscelin of Courtenay in 1104.

Identification with Thoros, father of Arda

It seems possible that Thoros of Marash is identical with Thoros, father of Arda of Armenia (Greek: Arete) who became the second wife of Baldwin of Boulogne. This Thoros had promised Baldwin to give his daughter a dowry of 60,000 bezants and a vague promise that she would inherit his lands. Additionally, the marriage with an Armenian might have given Baldwin a legitimate claim to Edessa since it was within the traditional area of Armenia. If this identification holds true, this would make Thoros the brother of another Armenian chieftain, Constantine of Gargar (today Gerger).

Thoros failed to pay the full dowry he had pledged. Also as Baldwin become King of Jerusalem, he no longer felt a need to have alliances with the Armenians as he was now further south. Baldwin had his marriage to Arda annulled. About the same time the forces of Edessa drove Thoros from his domain. He was then forced to flee to Constantinople and became part of an anti-Crusader faction in Constantinople advocating that the Byzantine Empire reassert its traditional hold on Armenian territories that were now held by the Crusader States.

References
Citations

Sources

Armenian nobility
11th-century Armenian people
12th-century Armenian people
11th-century births
Medieval Armenian generals
Lists of Armenian people
Year of death missing

ru:Торос Эдесский